Otholobium pubescens is a plant species in the genus Otholobium. It has been used in traditional medicine in Peru.  The plant contains the chemical compound bakuchiol, which has been studied in a mouse model for its potential antihyperglycemic effects.

References

Psoraleeae